Corneliu "Cornel" Oros (born 5 March 1950) is a retired Romanian volleyball player. He competed at the 1972 and 1980 Olympics and won a bronze medal in 1980.

Oros took up volleyball in 1964 in Oradea Sports School. He then moved to Dinamo București and won with them eight national titles between 1972 and 1980. At the CEV Champions League his team finished second in 1968, 1974 and 1977 and third in 1975. In 1968 he was included to the national team and won bronze medals at the 1969 junior and 1971 senior European championships. After retiring from competitions he worked as a volleyball coach, first at Dinamo București in Romania and then in Spain.

References

External links 

 
 
 

1951 births
Living people
Romanian people of Hungarian descent
Romanian men's volleyball players
Olympic volleyball players of Romania
Volleyball players at the 1972 Summer Olympics
Volleyball players at the 1980 Summer Olympics
Olympic bronze medalists for Romania
Olympic medalists in volleyball
Medalists at the 1980 Summer Olympics
Sportspeople from Oradea